Taush is a rural locality (a selo) and the administrative center of Taushinskoye Rural Settlement, Chernushinsky District, Perm Krai, Russia. The population was 891 as of 2010. There are 14 streets.

Geography 
Taush is located 11 km south of Chernushka (the district's administrative centre) by road. Verkh-Yemash is the nearest rural locality.

References 

Rural localities in Chernushinsky District